Muciño is a surname. Notable people with the surname include:

 Arely Muciño (born 1989), Mexican professional boxer
 César Muciño (1972–2003), Mexican cyclist
 Claudia Muciño (born 1971), Mexican former professional tennis player
 Jennifer Mucino-Fernandez (born 2002), American archer
 Luis Muciño (born 1936), Mexican former cyclist
 Octavio Muciño (1950–1974), Mexican professional football player